The 1997 Goody's Headache Powder 500 was the 22nd stock car race of the 1997 NASCAR Winston Cup Series and the 37th iteration of the event. The race was held on Saturday, August 23, 1997, in Bristol, Tennessee at Bristol Motor Speedway, a 0.533 miles (0.858 km) permanent oval-shaped racetrack. The race took the scheduled 500 laps to complete. In the final laps of the race, Robert Yates Racing driver Dale Jarrett would manage to take the lead with 30 laps to go and pull away to take his 12th career NASCAR Winston Cup Series victory and his fourth of the season. To fill out the top three, Roush Racing driver Mark Martin and Donlavey Racing driver Dick Trickle would finish second and third, respectively.

Background 

The Bristol Motor Speedway, formerly known as Bristol International Raceway and Bristol Raceway, is a NASCAR short track venue located in Bristol, Tennessee. Constructed in 1960, it held its first NASCAR race on July 30, 1961. Despite its short length, Bristol is among the most popular tracks on the NASCAR schedule because of its distinct features, which include extraordinarily steep banking, an all concrete surface, two pit roads, and stadium-like seating. It has also been named one of the loudest NASCAR tracks.

Entry list 

 (R) denotes rookie driver.

Qualifying 
Qualifying was split into two rounds. The first round was held on Friday, August 22, at 5:30 PM EST. Each driver would have one lap to set a time. During the first round, the top 25 drivers in the round would be guaranteed a starting spot in the race. If a driver was not able to guarantee a spot in the first round, they had the option to scrub their time from the first round and try and run a faster lap time in a second round qualifying run, held on Saturday, August 23, at 12:30 PM EST. As with the first round, each driver would have one lap to set a time. Positions 26-38 would be decided on time, and depending on who needed it, the 39th thru either the 42nd, 43rd, or 44th position would be based on provisionals. Four spots are awarded by the use of provisionals based on owner's points. The fifth is awarded to a past champion who has not otherwise qualified for the race. If no past champion needs the provisional, the field would be limited to 42 cars. If a champion needed it, the field would expand to 43 cars. If the race was a companion race with the NASCAR Winston West Series, four spots would be determined by NASCAR Winston Cup Series provisionals, while the final two spots would be given to teams in the Winston West Series, leaving the field at 44 cars.

Three drivers would fail to qualify: Morgan Shepherd, Robby Gordon, and Dave Marcis.

Full qualifying results

Race results

References 

1997 NASCAR Winston Cup Series
NASCAR races at Bristol Motor Speedway
August 1997 sports events in the United States
1997 in sports in Tennessee